Are You the One? El Match Perfecto is a Mexican reality television series on MTV Latin America. It is a Mexican version of the original American series. It follows 20 people who are living together in a tropical destination to find their perfect match. If the 10 men and 10 women are able to correctly choose all ten perfect matches in ten weeks, they will win $200 thousand to split among them. Each episode the cast will pair up with whoever they believe their perfect match is to compete in a challenge. The winners of the challenge will go on a date, and have a chance to test their match in the truth booth. The cast members will choose one of the winning couples to go to the truth booth to determine if they are a perfect match or not. This is the only way to confirm matches. Each episode ends with a matching ceremony where the couples will be told how many perfect matches they have, but not which matches are correct. It debuted in September 2016 on MTV Latin America.

Season 1
Season one premiered on September 20, 2016. Filmed in Dominican Republic.

Cast

Progress

Notes
 Unconfirmed Perfect Match

Truth Booths

Season 2
In November 2017, a second season of Are You The One: The Perfect Match was announced, which will premiere in 2018. The second season was filmed in Trancoso, Bahia and premiered on MTV Latin America on February 12, 2018. It was hosted by Mexican actor Vadhir Derbez. Israel Rudovsky previously competed in Big Brother Mexico. Quetzalli Bulnes was part of the second season of Mexico's Next Top Model, while Talía Loaiza stands out for having been part of Acapulco Shore.

Cast

Progress

Notes 
 Unconfirmed Perfect Match
 Confirmed Perfect Match

Truth Booths

After Filming
Dianey Sahagún in 2018 appeared on the first season of the Mexican version of the reality show Ex on the Beach. Clovis Nienow later participated in the first season of Resistiré in 2019 and in Jugando con Fuego Latino in 2021. While Elizabeth Varela competed in the second season of Resistiré in 2021 and has been part of Acapulco Shore since 2022. Mario Albornoz appeared on the first season of De Férias com o Ex: Caribe.

References

External links
 

2016 Mexican television series debuts
Mexican reality television series
MTV original programming
Are You the One?
2018 Mexican television series endings
Television shows filmed in the Dominican Republic
Television shows filmed in Bahia